The Zona Boêmia  is a region in the commercial centre of Belo Horizonte, Brazil, noted for its abundancy of bars, brothels, sex theatres and motels, and many consider it the city's red light district.

Red-light districts in Brazil
Neighbourhoods in Belo Horizonte